The Théâtre National de Chaillot (English: Chaillot National Theatre) is a theatre located in the Palais de Chaillot at 1, place du Trocadéro, in the 16th arrondissement of Paris. Close by the Eiffel Tower and the Trocadéro Gardens—the Théâtre de Chaillot is among the largest concert halls in Paris. It has long been synonymous with popular theatre and is especially associated with stars such as Jean Vilar and Antoine Vitez. In 1975 the French Ministry of Culture designated it as one of the four national theatres of Paris.

History
The Théâtre national de Chaillot was built between 1934 and 1937 by the brothers Jean and Édouard Niermans for the Paris Exhibition of 1937 on the site of the former Trocadéro Palace, itself an elaborate structure built for the Paris World's Fair of 1878. Starting in 1973 the interior of the theatre was completely renovated by the team of Valentine Fabre and John Perrottet and now houses a theatre school and three theatre venues: the Salle-Jean Vilar with 1250 seats, the Salle Gémier with 420 seats, and an 80-seat studio dedicated to small productions and avant-garde shows.

In 2007, France's Ministry for Culture under Christine Albanel directed the Théâtre national de Chaillot to promote contemporary dance—especially the work of French choreographers. This announcement was greeted by controversy and outright hostility in some quarters. Nevertheless, according to the Paris convention and visitors bureau, the Chaillot is dedicated to a presenting world class international dance, theatre, circus and visual arts—to being "a theatre that welcomes art in all its diversity". It regularly hosts international dance companies such as The Forsythe Company, the Royal Swedish Ballet, and the Irish troop Colin Dunne.

The Chaillot is a frequent venue of au courant fashion shows featuring top designers such as Giorgio Armani, Elie Saab, and Claude Montana.

Directors

Directors of the old theatre (demolished in 1935):
 1920–1933 Firmin Gemier
 1933–1935 Albert Fourtier

Directors of the new theatre (rebuilt in 1937):
 1938–1939 Paul Abram
 1941–1951 Pierre Aldebert
 1951–1963 Jean Vilar
 1963–1972 Georges Wilson
 1973–1974 Jack Lang
 1974–1981 Andre-Louis Périnetti
 1981–1988 Antoine Vitez
 1988–2000 Jérôme Savary
 2000–2008 Ariel Goldenberg
 2008–2011 Jose Montalvo and Dominique Hervieu
 2011–present Didier Deschamps

References

External links

 

Theatres in Paris
Buildings and structures in the 16th arrondissement of Paris
Monuments and memorials in Paris
Beaux-Arts architecture in France